Dušan Drška (12 June 1953 – 24 December 1999) was a Slovak weightlifter. He competed at the 1976 Summer Olympics and the 1980 Summer Olympics.

References

1953 births
1999 deaths
Slovak male weightlifters
Olympic weightlifters of Czechoslovakia
Weightlifters at the 1976 Summer Olympics
Weightlifters at the 1980 Summer Olympics
People from Myjava
Sportspeople from the Trenčín Region